The 2004 WNBA season was the eighth season for the New York Liberty.

Dispersal Draft
Based on the Liberty's 2003 record, they would pick 4th in the Cleveland Rockers dispersal draft. The Liberty picked Ann Wauters.

WNBA Draft

Regular season
Heading into its eighth WNBA season, the club acquired veteran Ann Wauters in the dispersal draft and Shameka Christon in the college draft. The Liberty opened the season with a 6-1 record. Despite the strong start, Pat Coyle replaced Richie Adubato as head coach. Under Coyle’s guidance, the team registered an 11-6 mark and secured their sixth playoff appearance.

There were injuries to starters Ann Wauters and Tari Phillips. The Liberty played to a sellout crowd for six games at the historic Radio City Music Hall. At Radio City Music Hall, the Liberty posted a 5-1 record. The reason for the relocation was that Madison Square Garden was hosting the 2004 Republican National Convention. In addition, the Liberty hosted another unique game: The Game at Radio City, which featured the USA Women’s Olympic team vs. a WNBA Select Team.

Season standings

Season Schedule

All six home games held between July 24 and September 16 were held at the Radio City Music Hall, due to the Garden being used for the Republican National Convention.

Player stats
Note: GP= Games played; REB= Rebounds; AST= Assists; STL = Steals; BLK = Blocks; PTS = Points

Playoffs

References

New York Liberty seasons
New York
New York Liberty